Paul Graham may refer to:

 Paul Graham (American football) (1892–1985), American college football player and coach
 Paul Graham (basketball player) (born 1967), former NBA player
 Paul Graham (basketball coach) (born 1951), college basketball coach
 Paul Graham (bodybuilder), Australian professional wrestler and bodybuilder
 Paul Graham (novelist), American novelist
 Paul Graham (photographer) (born 1956), British photographer
 Paul Graham (programmer) (born 1964), Lisp programmer, venture capitalist, and essayist

See also
 Graham Paul (born 1947), fencer